Jenice Dena Portlock (born November 24, 1987), also known as Sabi, is an American pop singer, songwriter, dancer and actress from Los Angeles, California.

She was formerly part of the hip hop girl group The Bangz.

Biography

Early life and career beginnings

As a kid growing up in Inglewood, California, daughter of a Salvadoran mother and African American father, Sabi was raised in a bilingual Spanish and English language household and spent every other weekend watching MTV at her father's house after her parents split up. Her father had cable television and her mother didn't, so she and her sisters were glued to the screen watching music videos all day – she especially loved watching Michael Jackson, Prince, and Sade. That's when she gained her immense passion for singing and song writing and made the decision that she wanted to be a performer. "I remember watching the Michael Jackson: Moonwalker video over and over and trying to pick up Michael's moves", she once said in an interview.

Sabi would also choreograph dance routines and marshal her younger sisters into performing them for the family. She got involved in theater in middle school and graduated from Westchester Senior High School in 2005. In 2008, she appeared in an independent short film called The Smallest River in Almirante, which was executive produced by actor Shia LaBeouf. She was cast in commercials for ABC Family, Universal Studios, and Pepsi while majoring in communications at California State University, Long Beach in 2009.

All the while, Sabi continued to work on her vocal technique trying to imitate other singers. "No matter who it was, Justin Timberlake, Brandy, or Alicia Keys, I could mimic exactly how they sounded. That's how I got comfortable with my voice." She began to write her own songs and record them on a voice recorder, but says that she really learned about the craft of songwriting after working with several producers that she had been introduced to through her then-manager.

2009–10: The Bangz and group disbandment
In the summer of 2009, Sabi was approached by The Co-Stars, a production team who were looking to launch a female duo. Urban/pop group The Bangz, featuring Sabi and Korttney Ann Elliott (a.k.a. Ella Ann) got signed to the indie recording label VNR, Asylum Records and Warner Bros. Records. With a video that hit almost a million views on YouTube and two singles ("Boys With Tattoos (We Jerkin')" and "Found My Swag" featuring the New Boyz) released, the group was starting to get national radio play and MTV exposure.

Shortly after, Ella Ann got seriously injured in a drive-by shooting and unable to continue, leaving Sabi to go on alone. She tried to continue without her; Sabi shot a video and did some performances on her own with back-up dancers, but no one felt the Bangz could continue without Ella, not even Sabi herself. The whole experience was an emotional rollercoaster for her. However, executives at Warner Bros. Records loved Sabi's talent and energy and wanted to continue the label's relationship with her as a solo artist.

2011–present: Solo career
In April 2011, Sabi released her song "Goodnight" on the internet as a buzz single to be included on her debut album.

Additionally, in 2011 Sabi was featured on Britney Spears' song "(Drop Dead) Beautiful" and the Cobra Starship single "You Make Me Feel...," which peaked at No. 7 on the U.S. Billboard Hot 100 and topped the charts in New Zealand. She later accompanied Spears on Femme Fatale Tour and was featured on the tour's DVD release. She was also featured on the New Boyz' song "Tough Kids", from their album Too Cool to Care.

Shortly after, she released the Cirkut-produced "Wild Heart" which was later recorded in Simlish for The Sims 3 video game. Her debut album, then titled "All I Want" was to feature production from Benny Blanco, Klas (from the Teddybears), Diplo, Ammo, The Cataracs and The Co-Stars and was due to be released via Dr. Luke's Kemosabe imprint and Warner Bros. Records. A video for "Wild Heart"' debuted on March 19, 2012. A brand new Dr. Luke and Cirkut-produced track "Where They Do That At?" featuring Wale premiered unexpectedly on April 17, 2012 on Spotify. The video for the song, directed by Tim Cruz, debuted on April 19, 2012, along with a behind-the-scenes video.

Sabi was also announced to be host of her own web-series about fashion titled Found My Swag named for The Bangz's single. The series premiered on The Warner Sound, the YouTube channel belonging to Sabi's record label Warner Brothers on November 1, 2012.

In November 2012, Sabi released the Jakob Owens-directed video another new single, titled "Champagne". The song was produced by Crack For Kids.

In August 2013, she released the Tyga-assisted "Cali Love", the lead single from her mixtape "0–60: Love Sounds" to be released later in 2013. Sabi released "Love Sounds", produced by Ryan McDermott in November 2013 and announced that the long-awaited mixtape "0 to 60: Love Sounds" would be released on November 13, 2013. On the eve of 0–60: Love Sounds’s release, Sabi premiered a cover of Fleetwood Mac’s 1977 No. 1 single, "Dreams," a track included on her mixtape. The entire 11-song mixtape was released for free download via the site HotNewHipHop.com.

After the release of the mixtape, Sabi parted ways with both Kemosabe and Warner Bros. Records and began recording music as an independent artist.

In 2017, Sabi released "The One", a promotional single made available exclusively via her SoundCloud account. Following three years of radio silence, she returned to music on Valentine's Day 2020 and released "Ready", produced by Malcolm D. McDaniel. Unlike "The One", the single was released to most major streaming platforms and digital download services via BlakBurd Ent. and Empire Distribution.

Later in 2020, she began hosting an Apple Music radio program titled, "Easy Hits Radio with Sabi", geared toward adult contemporary music.

Discography

Mixtapes

Singles

Promotional singles 
 Goodnight (2011)
 The One (2017)

Featured singles

Other appearances

Sabi's vocals are not officially credited on this release.

Music videos

References

External links
 
 
 
 Works by or about Sabi in libraries (WorldCat Catalog)

1987 births
Living people
21st-century American singers
21st-century American women singers
American contemporary R&B singers
American dance musicians
American electronic musicians
American female dancers
American hip hop singers
American indie pop musicians
American people of Salvadoran descent
American women in electronic music
American women pop singers
California State University, Long Beach alumni
Musicians from Inglewood, California
Singers from Los Angeles
Synth-pop singers